Juan Liscano Velutini (7 July 1915 – 17 February 2001) was a Venezuelan poet, folklorist, writer and critic. Director of Monte Ávila Editores, among his poetic work emphasizes: Nuevo mundo Orinoco (1959), Cármenes (1966) and Fundaciones (1981). Also wrote: Panorama de la literatura venezolana actual (1973) Espiritualidad y literatura: una relación tormentosa (1976), Los fuegos apagados (1990) and El origen sigue siendo (1991). In 1990 published a personal Anthology, a route for his poetic trajectory. He won the National Prize for Literature in 1951.

See also 
 Venezuela
 Venezuelan literature

People from Caracas
Venezuelan literary critics
20th-century Venezuelan poets
Folklorists
1915 births
2001 deaths
Venezuelan male poets
20th-century male writers
Venezuelan people of Corsican descent